Ruby Wylder Rivera Modine (born July 31, 1990) is an American actress, dancer and singer. She is best known for playing Sierra Morton in Shameless, and co-starring in the 2017 slasher film Happy Death Day and its sequel as Lori Spengler. She is the lead singer of the band Ruby Modine and the Disease.

Personal life
Modine was born on July 31, 1990 in Los Angeles, California, the daughter of Caridad Rivera, a makeup and wardrobe stylist, and actor Matthew Modine. Her mother is Puerto Rican, and she has a brother, Boman, who is an assistant director for films.

Career

Modine was cast as Sierra in the seventh season of Shameless. On November 8, 2016, she was cast to co-star in the slasher film Happy Death Day starring Jessica Rothe and Israel Broussard. The film opened in 2017, to positive reviews. Modine reprised her role in the 2019 sequel, Happy Death Day 2U.

Filmography

Film

Television

References

External links 

1990 births
Living people
21st-century American actresses
Actresses from Los Angeles
American film actresses
American people of Puerto Rican descent
American television actresses
Hispanic and Latino American actresses